General James Alward Van Fleet (March 19, 1892 – September 23, 1992) was a United States Army officer who saw service during World War I, World War II and the Korean War. Van Fleet was a native of New Jersey, who was raised in Florida and graduated from the United States Military Academy. He served as a regimental, divisional and corps commander during World War II and as the commanding general of United States Army and other United Nations forces during the Korean War.

Early life and education

James Van Fleet was born in the Coytesville section of Fort Lee, New Jersey, but his parents moved to Florida when he was an infant and he was raised there.  Van Fleet received his high school education at the Summerlin Institute in Bartow, Florida.

After graduating from Summerlin in 1911, Van Fleet received an appointment to the United States Military Academy at West Point, New York.  While he was a cadet at West Point, he was a member of the Army football team and was a standout fullback on the undefeated Army team of 1914.  Van Fleet graduated in the famous West Point Class of 1915, which included so many future generals that it has been called "the class the stars fell on" (stars being the insignia of generals). Van Fleet's classmates included Dwight D. Eisenhower and Omar Bradley, among many others. After graduation, he was commissioned as a second lieutenant into the Infantry Branch of the United States Army.

Military career

Early career
After Van Fleet was commissioned, he was assigned to a company of the 3rd Infantry Regiment at Plattsburgh, New York, where he served from September 12 to October 1, 1915. He then served at Madison Barracks, in Sacketts Harbor, New York, until May 11, 1916. The 3rd Infantry was then transferred to Eagle Pass, Texas, for service on the Mexican border until October 8, 1917, over six months after the American entry into World War I. During his time in Texas, Van Fleet was promoted twice, to first lieutenant on July 1, 1916, and to captain on May 15, 1917.

Van Fleet then transferred to Fort Leavenworth, Kansas, where he served as an instructor for provisional officers, October 10, 1917, to March 22, 1918; commanding Army Service Schools Detachment No. 2, to April 6, 1918; at Kansas City, Missouri, inspecting 7th Infantry Regiment, National Guard of Missouri, April 1 to 5; at Camp Forrest, Ga., Camp Wadsworth, S. C., and Camp Mills, Long Island, commanding a company of the 16th Machine Gun Battalion, from April 10 to July 4, 1918.  He received a temporary promotion to major on June 17, 1918.

Van Fleet was then shipped to France, where he commanded the 17th Machine Gun Battalion, part of the 6th Division, from September 12, 1918, to June 11, 1919. He was wounded in action in the Meuse–Argonne offensive on November 4, 1918, just seven days before the Armistice with Germany which caused hostilities to cease.

Interwar period
After the war, Van Fleet was reduced to his permanent rank of captain in 1922 and promoted to major in the Regular Army in December 1924. While serving as the senior officer of the University of Florida's U.S. Army Reserve Officers' Training Corps (ROTC) program, Van Fleet also served as the head coach of the Florida Gators football team in 1923 and 1924, after assisting William G. Kline for a year. He led the Gators into national prominence with a 12–3–4 (.737) record.

From 1924 to 1927 he was stationed at Camp Galliard in the Panama Canal Zone where he commanded the 1st Battalion of the 42nd Infantry. This assignment was followed by one at the Infantry School at Fort Benning, Georgia. At Fort Benning Van Fleet served as an instructor from April 1927 to September 1928 and as a student in the Advanced Course from September 1928 to June 1929. In addition to his other duties, Van Fleet served as head coach of the post's football team. Van Fleet then returned to the University of Florida where he was the Professor of Military Science and Tactics from July 1929 to June 1933.

From July 1933 to July 1935 he was stationed at Fort Williams in Cape Elizabeth, Maine, where he served as commander of the 2nd Battalion of the 5th Infantry and also as the post's executive officer. During this assignment, he oversaw the construction of a duck pond in the northwest corner of the parade field.

Unlike the majority of his fellow officers who rose to high command in the next few years, Van Fleet was unique in the sense that he never attended either the Command and Staff College or the Army War College during his military career.

World War II
Van Fleet commanded the 8th Infantry Regiment (part of the 4th Infantry Division) for three years (July 1941 to July 1944) and led it into combat in Europe in World War II, participating in the D-Day landings on Utah Beach in June 1944. On Utah Beach Van Fleet distinguished himself by outstanding combat leadership and was awarded his first Distinguished Service Cross (DSC). 

Although widely regarded by many as an outstanding officer, he was blocked from promotion because the Army Chief of Staff, General George C. Marshall, who had a tendency to forget and confuse names, erroneously confused Van Fleet with a well-known alcoholic officer with a similar name. When General Dwight D. Eisenhower, a former West Point classmate of Van Fleet's and now the Supreme Allied Commander in Western Europe, informed Marshall of his mistake, Van Fleet was soon promoted to divisional and corps command.

Following promotion to brigadier general in August 1944, Van Fleet became the Assistant Division Commander of the 2nd Infantry Division (July to September 1944) and then briefly commanded the 4th Infantry Division (September to October 1944) before assuming command of the 90th "Tough Ombres" Infantry Division (October 1944 to February 1945) and gaining a promotion to major general in November. He gained the admiration and respect of his superiors, in particular Lieutenant General George S. Patton, commander of the Third Army, for his command of the 90th.

After briefly commanding XXIII Corps, on 17 March 1945 Van Fleet replaced Major General John Millikin as commander of III Corps where Millikin served with Patton's Third Army.  Van Fleet commanded III Corps through the end of the war and the occupation of Germany until returning to the United States in February 1946.

Post World War II
Van Fleet was reassigned to Governor's Island, New York, as commander of the 2nd Service Command before becoming the Deputy Commanding General of the 1st United States Army in June 1946.  In December 1947 he went to Frankfurt, Germany as G-3 (operations officer) of the United States European Command.

In February 1948, Van Fleet was promoted to lieutenant general and sent to Greece as the head of the Joint U.S. Military Advisory Group and executor of the "Truman Doctrine".  He was instrumental in the outcome of the Greek Civil War by providing advice to the Greek government and 250 military advisers, as well as administering $400 million in military aid. The central square in the northern Greek city of Kastoria has featured a bust of Van Fleet for many years, and was replaced with a new statue as recently as 2007.

Van Fleet was commanding general of the Second United States Army from August 10, 1950, to April 11, 1951.

Korea
On April 14, 1951, Van Fleet replaced General Matthew B. Ridgway as commander of the U.S. Eighth Army and United Nations forces in Korea when Ridgway took over for General MacArthur upon MacArthur's recall to the United States. He was promoted to four-star general on July 31, 1951.  He continued Ridgway's efforts to strengthen the Eighth Army in its campaign against Communist Chinese and North Korean enemy forces.  His only son, U.S. Air Force Captain James Alward Van Fleet Jr., was a B-26 bomber pilot who was MIA/killed in the Korean War.

In early 1951, Van Fleet proposed an amphibious landing at Wonsan, behind communist lines. The political fallout of MacArthur's removal, however, persuaded Ridgway to veto the plan.

Van Fleet commanded the 8th Army until February 11, 1953, when he was relieved by General Maxwell Taylor.  He retired from the Army at the end of March at the age of 61.

Legacy and death
At the time of his retirement from active duty on March 31, 1953, former President Harry S. Truman said "General Van Fleet is the greatest general we have ever had . . .  I sent him to Greece and he "won" the war.  I sent him to Korea and he "won" the war."  Van Fleet was the recipient of three Distinguished Service Crosses (the U.S. Army's second highest award for bravery in combat), three Silver Stars, three Bronze Stars, three Purple Hearts for wounds received in combat, and his most prized decoration—the Combat Infantryman's Badge (CIB) of the common foot soldier. He appeared on the July 26, 1953, episode of What's My Line?

In 1957, Van Fleet was the moving spirit behind the establishment in New York of The Korea Society, the first nonprofit organization in the United States dedicated to the promotion of friendly relations between the peoples of the United States and Korea "through mutual understanding and appreciation of their respective cultures, aims, ideals, arts, sciences and industries."

Van Fleet died in his sleep on his ranch outside Polk City, Florida, on September 23, 1992, six months after his 100th birthday that March.  He was the oldest living general officer in the United States at the time of his death.  Van Fleet and his wife Helen are buried in Arlington National Cemetery. Buried with them is Van Fleet's second wife, Virginia, who died in 1986.

Shortly after his death, The Korea Society established its annual James A. Van Fleet Award to recognize those who have made outstanding contributions to closer U.S.-Korea ties.  The General James A. Van Fleet State Trail, running from Polk City to Mabel, Florida, is also named in his honor.  The University of Florida presented Van Fleet an honorary doctorate in 1946, and the university's military sciences building, which houses the U.S. Air Force, Army and Navy ROTC programs, is named Van Fleet Hall.  He was inducted into the University of Florida Athletic Hall of Fame as an "honorary letter winner" in 1971.  In 1998, a panel of Florida historians and other consultants named Van Fleet one of the fifty most important Floridians of the 20th century.

Van Fleet's estate donated his papers to the George C. Marshall Foundation, and are the second largest collection of papers held by the foundation, after those of General Marshall.

Van Fleet was also an art collector and donated many rare and exceptional Asian objects to the Samuel P. Harn Museum of Art.

Van Fleet and his wife, Helen Moore Van Fleet, had three children, eight grandchildren, and twelve great-grandchildren.

A statue honoring him was erected at the central square of the Greek city of Kastoria, which was the location of his advanced command post during the Greek Civil War. There is also statue honoring him at the grounds of Korean Military Academy, in recognition of his support for the South Korean Army during the Korean War.

Awards and decorations
Van Fleet's military awards include: 

Van Fleet also received the following foreign decorations:
  Grand Cross of the Order of the Phoenix (Greece)
 Distinguished Medal of Honor (Greece)
  Grand Commander of the Order of George I (Greece)
  Order of Diplomatic Service Merit with gold star (Korea)
  Order of the Lion and the Sun, grade 1 (Iran)
  Distinguished Service Order (United Kingdom)
  Legion of Honor (France)
  Croix de Guerre with palm (France)
  Croix de Guerre with palm (Belgium)
  Grand Cross of the Order of Orange Nassau with swords (Netherlands)
  Order of Boyaca (Colombia)

Also decorations from the following countries:
 Ethiopia
 Thailand
 Philippines
 Republic of China

Promotions

Head coaching record

See also
 List of United States Military Academy alumni
 List of University of Florida faculty and administrators
 List of University of Florida honorary degree recipients
 List of University of Florida Athletic Hall of Fame members

References

Bibliography
 2012 Florida Football Media Guide, University Athletic Association, Gainesville, Florida (2012).
 Braim, Paul F., Will to Win: The Life of General James A. Van Fleet, Naval Institute Press, Annapolis, Maryland (2001).
 Bruce, Robert B., "Tethered Eagle: Lt-General James A. Van Fleet and the Quest for Military Victory in the Korean War, April – June 1951," Army History 82 (Winter 2012).
 Carlson, Norm, University of Florida Football Vault: The History of the Florida Gators, Whitman Publishing, LLC, Atlanta, Georgia (2007).  .
 Golenbock, Peter, Go Gators!  An Oral History of Florida's Pursuit of Gridiron Glory, Legends Publishing, LLC, St. Petersburg, Florida (2002).  .
 McCarthy, Kevin M., Fightin' Gators: A History of University of Florida Football, Arcadia Publishing, Mount Pleasant, South Carolina (2000).  .
 McEwen, Tom, The Gators: A Story of Florida Football, The Strode Publishers, Huntsville, Alabama (1974).  .
 Nash, Noel, ed., The Gainesville Sun Presents The Greatest Moments in Florida Gators Football, Sports Publishing, Inc., Champaign, Illinois (1998).  .
 Proctor, Samuel, & Wright Langley, Gator History: A Pictorial History of the University of Florida, South Star Publishing Company, Gainesville, Florida (1986).

External links

 Korean Art: Collecting Treasures, online exhibition featuring Korean objects from the Van Fleet Collection at the Harn Museum of Art
 James Van Fleet Digital Collection from the George A. Smathers Libraries, University of Florida
 James Alward Van Fleet
 
 Arlington National Cemetery
Generals of World War II
United States Army Officers 1939–1945

|-

|-

|-

|-

|-
|-

1892 births
1992 deaths
American centenarians
Men centenarians
United States Army personnel of World War I
United States Army personnel of the Korean War
American people of Dutch descent
Army Black Knights football players
Burials at Arlington National Cemetery
Florida Gators football coaches
Kansas State Wildcats football coaches
Recipients of the Distinguished Service Cross (United States)
Recipients of the Distinguished Service Medal (US Army)
Recipients of the Silver Star
Grand Crosses of the Order of the Phoenix (Greece)
Grand Commanders of the Order of George I
Companions of the Distinguished Service Order
Recipients of the Legion of Honour
Recipients of the Croix de Guerre 1939–1945 (France)
Recipients of the Croix de guerre (Belgium)
Knights Grand Cross of the Order of Orange-Nassau
United States Army Infantry Branch personnel
United States Army generals
United States Military Academy alumni
University of Florida faculty
Bartow High School alumni
People of the Greek Civil War
People from Fort Lee, New Jersey
People from Polk County, Florida
Sportspeople from Bergen County, New Jersey
Military personnel from New Jersey
Military personnel from Florida
Graduates of the United States Military Academy Class of 1915
United States Army generals of World War II